Joseph Day may refer to:

 Joe Day (ice hockey) (born 1968), American ice hockey center
 Joe Day (footballer) (born 1990), English football goalkeeper
 Joseph Day (inventor) (1855–1946), inventor of the modern two-stroke engine
 Joseph A. Day (born 1945), Canadian senator
 Joseph P. Day (1874–1944), American real estate entrepreneur
 Joseph Day (Massachusetts politician), representative to the Great and General Court

See also
 Joseph Daye (born 1990), Australian rule footballer